The 1946–47 BAA season was the Toronto Huskies' inaugural and sole season of existence. The NBA's first game was played at Maple Leaf Gardens in Toronto on November 1, 1946. The New York Knickerbockers defeated the Toronto Huskies 68–66 at Maple Leaf Gardens. The teams were part of the Basketball Association of America, the forerunner to the NBA. The Huskies finished last in their division and folded after one season. Throughout the season, the Huskies had four head coaches:  Ed Sadowski 3–9, Lew Hayman 0–1, Dick Fitzgerald 2–1, and Red Rolfe 17–27.

Roster

Regular season
The attendance for the inaugural match was 7,090 with ticket prices ranging from 75 cents to two dollars and fifty cents. On that night, anyone taller than George Nostrand, the tallest Husky at 6'8", was given free admission.

Attendance quickly dwindled and the Toronto Star published an estimate that team owners Eric Cradock (co-owner of the Montreal Alouettes football team) and Harold Shannon lost $100,000 in one season of operations. The managing director of the Huskies was Lew Hayman, who was also the coach and general manager of the Alouettes. Previously, he had been a star basketball player at Syracuse University. Other key figures included team president Charles Watson, co-founders Ben Newman and Salter Hayden and Annis Stukus.

Season standings

Record vs. opponents

Game log

Regular season

Player stats
Note: GP= Games played; FG= Field Goals; FT= Free Throws; FTA = Free Throws Attempted; AST = Assists; PTS = Points

Playoffs
The Huskies did not qualify for the postseason.

Transactions

Trades

Purchases

References

External links
 1946-47 Huskies Season on Database Basketball
 1946-47 Huskies Season on Basketball Reference

Toronto Huskies seasons
Toronto